Aaron G. MacKenzie (born March 7, 1981, in Terrace Bay, Ontario) is a Canadian former professional ice hockey defenceman. He played briefly in the National Hockey League (NHL) with the Colorado Avalanche, where he currently resides.

Playing career
Undrafted, MacKenzie played junior hockey with the Thunder Bay Flyers of the USHL, before playing collegiate hockey with the University of Denver for four years. After his senior year with the Pioneers, MacKenzie turned pro signing with the St. Louis Blues on October 6, 2003.

MacKenzie made his professional debut in the 2003–04 season with Blues affiliate, the Worcester IceCats of the AHL. While never playing a game with the Blues, Mackenzie became a fixture in the AHL, playing with the Blues affiliates for 5 years.

On July 14, 2008, MacKenzie signed with the Colorado Avalanche and was assigned to affiliate, the Lake Erie Monsters, to start the 2008–09 season. MacKenzie received his first NHL recall on November 29, 2008, but did not feature in a game for the Avalanche. Towards the end of the season, MacKenzie was recalled again to the Avalanche on April 4, 2009, and made his NHL debut in a 4–1 victory against the Vancouver Canucks on April 5, 2009.

Unsigned prior to the 2009-10 season, MacKenzie signed with the Idaho Steelheads of the ECHL on October 19, 2009. After appearing in  3 games with the Steelheads, Aaron left the team to sign with HC Pardubice of the Czech Extraliga on November 2, 2009. MacKenzie settled as a stay-at-home defender in the Czech Republic and appeared in 29 games to help, the Dominik Hašek inspired Pardubice, capture the Championship for the first time since 2005.

On June 16, 2010, Mackenzie left Pardubice and signed as a free agent to a one-year contract with Austrian team, EHC Black Wings Linz of the EBEL.

On June 12, 2012, MacKenzie signed with the Central Hockey League's Denver Cutthroats, making him the first signed player in franchise history. After two seasons as captain of the Cutthroats, and coming off a finals appearance, MacKenzie was due to return for a third season in the ill-fated CHL before the club announced its suspension of operations, effectively ending MacKenzie's professional season.

Career statistics

Awards and honors

References

External links

1981 births
Colorado Avalanche players
Denver Cutthroats players
Denver Pioneers men's ice hockey players
EHC Black Wings Linz players
HC Dynamo Pardubice players
Ice hockey people from Ontario
Idaho Steelheads (ECHL) players
Lake Erie Monsters players
Living people
People from Thunder Bay District
Peoria Rivermen (AHL) players
Thunder Bay Flyers players
Tohoku Free Blades players
Undrafted National Hockey League players
Worcester IceCats players
Canadian ice hockey defencemen
Canadian expatriate ice hockey players in the United States
Canadian expatriate ice hockey players in the Czech Republic
Canadian expatriate ice hockey players in Austria
Canadian expatriate ice hockey players in Japan